The George Pocock Memorial Rowing Center (Pocock Rowing Center) is an amateur rowing club famous for its namesake and its ability to produce world-class rowers.

Prominent members

Members on the 2009 US National Team
Steve Dani, Coaching Staff	 
Bryan Volpenhein, Coaching Staff	 
Lindsey Hochman, Lightweight Women's Quadruple Sculls (LW4x)
Abby Broughton, Lightweight Women's Quadruple Sculls (LW4x)

Members on the 2008 US Olympic Team
Anna Cummins (5 seat) Women's Eight (W8+)	
Lia Pernell (bow) Women's Quadruple Sculls (W4x)	 
Anna Cummins (stroke) Women's Pair (W2-)

Members on the 2007 US National Team
Lindsay Meyer, Spares	 
Anna Mickelson, Women's Eight (W8+)
Anna Mickelson, Women's Pair (W2-)	
Lia Pernell, Women's Quadruple Sculls (W4x)

Notes

External links 

George Pocock Rowing Foundation
Pocock Racing Shells

Rowing clubs in the United States